Dōmoto, Domoto or Doumoto is a Japanese surname. Notable people with the surname include:

, Japanese politician
, Japanese painter
, Japanese architect and landscape architect
, Japanese idol, singer-songwriter, composer, lyricist, television personality, voice actor and actor
, Japanese idol, singer, songwriter, actor and television personality

See also
4975 Dohmoto, a main-belt asteroid

Japanese-language surnames